Olubankole Wellington (born 27 March 1981), popularly known by his stage name Banky W and credited in film as Banky Wellington, is a Nigerian singer, rapper, actor, entrepreneur and politician.

Early life 
Olubankole Wellington was born in the United States on 27 March, 1981 to Nigerian parents. His family returned to Nigeria when he was five years old. He began singing at a young age in his church choir.

Education 
Wellington schooled in Lagos for his primary and secondary education and returned to further his tertiary education at Rensselaer Polytechnic Institute, New York, US on a scholarship. He started the record label Empire Mates Entertainment (E.M.E) in 2002 while studying. He also worked at GlobalSpec. In 2009, he left the US for Nigeria and established his record label in Lagos by signing artists like Niyola, Shaydee, Skales , and Wizkid to the label. He released a début studio album, Back in the Building, in 2005. His début single was Ebute Metta 
He wrote the first theme song of Etisalat Nigeria titled "0809ja for life".

Career

2012–2013: R&BW
The day after Valentine's Day of 2013, Wellington launched his new album "R&BW" with a concert tagged the "Grand Love Concert" at the Civic Centre, Ozumba Mbadiwe, Victoria Island, Lagos, which featured several other artistes including Iyanya and Waje. The first two singles from the album are "Lowkey" and "Yes/No".

2017: Dissolution of E.M.E 
Wellington announced in February 2018 that E.M.E was being dissolved as a record label; he said the label would move forward as a talent management company focused on creative marketing, advertising, PR and brand events. Wellington named DJ Xclusive, Ebuka Obi-Uchendu, Tolu 'Toolz' Oniru, and his wife Adesua Etomi as the first set of clients of the rebranded company.

Other collaborations
In 2017, Wellington took part in initialing of a monumental collaboration art piece, Iyasile Naa also known as The Legacy.

Political career 
On 11 November 2018, Wellington announced his intent to run for the Lagos' Eti-Osa Federal Constituency seat in Nigeria's House of Representatives, on the platform of Modern Democratic Party, formed in 2017.

On 23 February 2019, Wellington lost the Eti-Osa Federal Constituency Elections to Babajide Obanikoro of the All Progressive Congress.

Ahead of 2023 general election, Wellington announced that he had decamped from the Modern Democratic Party to the Peoples Democratic Party, seeking the party's ticket to again vie for the Lagos' Eti-Osa Federal Constituency seat in Nigeria's House of Representatives.
In June 2022, Banky W won the Peoples Democratic Party ticket to contest as the party bearer for the Eti Osa constituency ahead of the 2023 election. 

However, the Presidential and Federal House of Representative election held on 25th February, 2023 was won by the Labour Party (LP) candidate, Mr. Thaddeus Attah which saw Banky W losing again, the Federal Constituency seat in Nigeria. The INEC Returning Officer announced the result but the party agents did not agree with it. The Party agents contested the result but the police and the army were called to maintain peace and order. In an interview after the result of the result of the election was announced, Banky W accepted the result of the INEC and declared: "I feel very grateful, even in defeat, because of the things we were able to accomplish."

Personal life 

Wellington married Adesua Etomi traditionally on 19 November 2017; the couple subsequently had their white wedding performed in South Africa on 25 November 2017. He had a successful skin cancer surgery on his shoulder in 2017. In early 2021, Wellington and Adesua had a son. They kept the pregnancy a secret, catching many off guard on news of the baby's arrival.

Discography

Albums
Studio albums
 Back in the Building (2006)
 Mr. Capable (2008)
 The W Experience (2009)
' 'R&BW (2013)

EPs
 Undeniable (2003)

Playlists
 2017: Songs About U (2017)

Compilation albums
 Empire Mates State of Mind (2012)

Selected singles
 2013: "Jasi"
 2014: "Jaiye Orimi"
 2015: "High Notes"
 2015: "All I Want Is You" feat. Chidinma
 2015: "Cash Only" As featured artist
 2016: "Made for You"
 2016: "Onyeuwaoma" As featured artist
 2016: "Mi Re Do (Cocoloso)" feat. Stonebwoy and Shaydee
 2021: “Selense” feat Mercy Chinwo

Filmography
 The Wedding Party (2016)
 The Wedding Party 2 (2017)
 Up North  (2018)
 Sugar Rush '' (2019)

Awards and nominations

 John Lennon Song Writing Award 2006, R&B Category, for 'My Regret’
 Best R&B Artiste, Nigerian Entertainment Awards 2006
 Best Male R&B Artiste, Urban Independent Music Awards, USA, 2006
 Best International Album, Nigerian Entertainment Awards 2007 for 'Mr Capable’
 Best R&B Video, Nigerian Music Video Awards 2008 for 'Don't Break My Heart’
 Best Male Vocal Performance, Hip hop World Awards 2009 for 'Don't Break My Heart’
 R&B Single of the year, 2010 Hip Hop World Awards for 'Strong Ting’
 Best R&B Singer (Male) and Best Music Video 2010 City People Entertainment Awards

See also 
 List of Nigerian musicians

References

External links
 
 

1981 births
Living people
21st-century African-American male singers
21st-century Nigerian male actors
21st-century Nigerian male singers
American emigrants to Nigeria
American people of Yoruba descent
Nigerian actor-politicians
Nigerian entertainment industry businesspeople
Nigerian hip hop singers
Nigerian male film actors
Nigerian male singer-songwriters
Nigerian male rappers
Nigerian music industry executives
Nigerian politicians
Nigerian rhythm and blues singer-songwriters
Yoruba male actors
Yoruba politicians
English-language singers from Nigeria
Yoruba-language singers
Musicians from Lagos
People from New York (state)
Politicians from Lagos
Rensselaer Polytechnic Institute alumni
The Headies winners